The Ducati Hypermotard is a supermotard Ducati motorcycle designed by Pierre Terblanche and was first seen at the November 2005 EICMA trade show in Milan. The Hypermotard was awarded "Best of Show" at EICMA and has since won other show awards.
The Hypermotard has a  dual spark (see 2010 MY revisions) 'Desmo' or 'Desmodromic' liquid-cooled two-valve 90° V-twin engine with fuel injection and weighs under .

The rigidly triangulated trellis frame wears 50 mm Marzocchi R.A.C. inverted forks, and has a Sachs/Öhlins remote reservoir shock attached to a strong, single-sided swing arm. The Marchesini racing wheels wear dual radially mounted Brembo four-piston, two-pad brake calipers matched with 305 mm discs up front, and a 245 mm disc with two-piston caliper at the rear.

History

There had been rumours for some time that Ducati would produce a supermotard class bike, which was a growing sector of the market mostly catered-for by the likes of KTM and Husqvarna. The unveiling of the Hypermotard concept was via a dedicated mini-site, linked to from the main Ducati website in March 2006. This apparently caused outages of the whole Ducati website, such was the interest in this distinctive-looking motorcycle.

The mini-site asked visitors to complete an online survey giving their opinion on the Hypermotard, as well as offering the opportunity to vote on configurations such as engine size, brakes and favourite features. The bike was still in concept form at the time and production was not guaranteed, but a subsequent post to the blog of then Ducati CEO Federico Minoli on 31 March 2006 confirmed that it would indeed go into production and also gave some details of the survey results.

Very few changes were made to the prototype to create the first production version, and quirky features such as the 'duck bill' front fender and handguards incorporating LED indicators/folding mirrors made it to the final version. Later blog entries featured some of the concept drawings and these are incredibly close to the finished machine.

In 2008, Greg Tracy won the 1200 Pro Class Division of the Pikes Peak International Hill Climb on a Hypermotard 1100S. It was the first Hypermotard to win an international competition and the first Ducati to win at the Pikes Peak since the race began in 1916.

Hypermotard 1100 revisions 

The first 2007 Hypermotard was available in two configurations: the base '1100' model and the higher specification '1100S' model. The more expensive 1100S featured a durable low friction diamond-like carbon (DLC) black coating to the front fork sliders, an Öhlins remote reservoir rear shock, the same Brembo Monobloc brake calipers used on the 1098, lighter forged aluminium Marchesini wheels with a red pin-stripe, Pirelli tires, plus carbon fibre fork protectors, timing belt covers, front mudguard/fender and tail/exhaust side panels. These upgrades made for a  weight saving;  versus  for the base model.

The specification remained virtually the same for 2009; however, the 1100S model received 48 mm Kayaba forks (with DLC coating) to replace the 50 mm Marzocchi items, while lower-spec Marzocchi forks continued to be offered on the base model. Also, for 2009 the 1100S model came with Ducati's DDA telemetry/data-logging device and software.

For 2010, the Hypermotard 1100 has been changed enough for the two models to receive new names reflecting the fact that the bike has 'evolved'. The 1100 Evo and the more expensive top-of-the-line 1100 Evo SP feature a redesigned engine which is no longer Dual Spark and has Siemens fuel injection in place of the previous models' Marelli system. The higher-compression engine is said to give  more, outputting  at a slightly lower engine speed of 7,500 rpm. Torque is fractionally lower than it was before at 75.9 lb-ft (10.5kgm), but peak torque appears 1,000 rpm higher in the rev range at 5750 rpm, which Ducati say allows owners to hang on to gears for longer. A new oil cooler has been fitted, with 85% more cooling area than before. The final drive gearing has also changed from 15/42 to 15/41.

The Evo features 50 mm Marzocchi forks and a Sachs rear shock, but the Evo SP features specially developed (1.2") taller 50 mm Marzocchi forks together with an Ohlins rear shock. The colour of the fork stanchions on both models is now black, the Evo SP also featuring a black DLC coating to the lower fork section. To complement the increased ride height of the Evo SP, it features handlebars that sit 20 mm higher than those on the base model. The speedometer unit is now similar to that fitted to the Ducati Streetfighter, with white backlighting.

The 2010 Hypermotard 1100 bikes are both considerably lighter than before, mainly due to the vacuum-cast engine casings, lighter crankshaft, flywheel and alternator, but the rear subframe has also been redesigned and both bikes carry some carbon fibre. The Evo SP gets the full complement of carbon fibre, as the 'S' model before it, but a rear hugger is now standard on the SP. The Evo model weighs  versus  for the Evo SP, the latter's cast alloy wheels making the difference. The Evo has Pirelli Diablo Rosso tyres and the Evo SP has Pirelli Diablo Supercorsa SP. As with last year's more expensive model, the SP comes with Ducati's DDA device/ software.

Custom models 

In November 2007, NCR announced the production of the 'Leggera', essentially a highly modified Hypermotard which was over  lighter and had around  more than the standard bike. It cost several times the asking price of the standard Hypermotard 1100S.

In December 2007, Roland Sands of Roland Sands Design (RSD) was commissioned by Ducati North America to build a custom Hypermotard. The modifications made were mainly cosmetic.

Ducati North America also began offering a Tri-colore special edition Ducati Hypermotard, with a modified racing seat, ECU, and sport exhaust. It was released in the Neiman Marcus Christmas catalog in the Fall of 2008.

Hypermotard 796 

In late 2009, Ducati introduced a new Hypermotard model – the 796 – featuring a 20 mm lower seat height (825 mm) and a smaller-capacity, less powerful engine. The 800 cc engine features Siemens fuel injection and is derived from the Monster.

The 796 has a wet 'slipper' clutch, not a Ducati trademark dry clutch as fitted to the 1100 models.

Pirelli Diablo Rosso tyres are fitted in the same sizes used on the Hypermotard 1100, but the 796 uses less substantial, non-adjustable 43 mm Marzocchi forks and has Sachs rear suspension. The single-sided swinging arm and fold-out mirrors of the 1100 model are retained. The aluminium wheels are made by Enkei.

The speedometer unit is similar to that fitted to the Ducati Streetfighter, with orange backlighting to differentiate the 796 from the 2010 1100 models.

2013 model year 

Ducati unveiled the 2013 Ducati Hypermotard lineup in November 2012. The three new models received countless updates from frame, body, suspension, exhaust, electronics and ergonomics.

The base model Hypermotard has a new 11-degree Testastretta 821 cc engine with longer valve service intervals, ride-by-wire, traction control and ABS and a  fuel tank. The Hypermotard line up also uses a new display and ride-by-wire system allowing riders to switch between different traction/ABS/throttle modes for street, track and rain.

The Hypermotard SP has a slightly lesser weight due to the use of carbon fibre engine and body components, and has higher suspension travel and response similar to the last generation. It also utilises 821 cc engine and lightweight wheels similar to those on the 1199 Panigale S.

References

External links 
Hypermotard official site

Hypermotard
Motorcycles introduced in 2007
Dual-sport motorcycles
Motorcycles designed by Pierre Terblanche